"My Eyes Can Only See as Far as You" is a song written by Naomi Martin and Jimmy Payne, and recorded by American country music artist Charley Pride.  It was released in February 1976 as the second single from the album The Happiness of Having You.  The song was Pride's sixteenth number one song on the country charts.  The single stayed at number one for a single week and spent a total of ten weeks on the country chart.

Charts

Weekly charts

Year-end charts

References

1976 singles
1976 songs
Charley Pride songs
RCA Records singles